Killing for Love (also known as The Promise) is a German documentary film directed by Marcus Vetter with Karin Steinberger. The film tells the crime story of the double murder of Derek and Nancy Haysom on 30 March 1985 in Bedford County, Virginia.

Synopsis
The film focuses on the two main protagonists Jens Söring, son of a German diplomat, and Elizabeth Haysom, the daughter of the murdered couple. Both were sentenced to life in prison.

Production
The film makes use of extensive original footage from press archives, as the two court cases were the first lawsuits to be broadcast nationwide on American television. In the film, these recordings from 1985 to 1990 are combined with scenes shot during the making of the film, including interviews with Jens Söring, witnesses, the investigators involved in the case, lawyers, prosecutors and journalists. In addition, extensive materials such as original crime scene photos and evidence, court transcripts, newspaper archives, love letters and diaries of the two main protagonists were evaluated in the film.

The film makes use of reenactments, featuring the voices of Daniel Brühl (as Söring) and Imogen Poots (as Haysom).

Releases
The film premiered at the Munich International Film Festival and was released theatrically in October 2016.

The film had its North American premiere on November 5, 2016, at the Virginia Film Festival. Further festival screenings were planned at the Denver Film Festival and Doc NYC.

In the U.K., it was shown in March 2017 by the BBC, as part of their documentary strand "Storyville", under the title Killing for Love.

In The Netherlands, public broadcaster NPO2 showed the film in two parts in its documentary series 2Doc in April 2017.

This film became the source material for a true crime podcast produced and narrated by Amanda Knox in 2019.

References

External links
 
 official movie website

2016 films
2010s crime films
2016 documentary films
2010s German-language films
2010s English-language films
German crime films
German documentary films
Documentary films about capital punishment in the United States
Documentary films about crime in the United States
Documentary films about criminals
Documentary films about law enforcement in the United States
Films about couples
Films about murderers
Films set in Virginia
Films shot in Virginia
2010s German films